One Hundred Views of New Tokyo (新東京百景, Shin Tōkyō Hyakkei) was a series of woodblock prints created from 1928 to 1932 by eight artists of the sōsaku hanga "creative print" movement.

The artists were Un'ichi Hiratsuka, Kōshirō Onchi, Sakuichi Fukazawa, Kawakami Sumio, Senpan Maekawa, Fujimori Shizuo, Henmi Takashi and Suwa Kanenori.

Publication
After much of Tokyo was destroyed by fire after the 1923 Great Kantō earthquake, a new wave of sōsaku-hanga artists banded together and looked to document the changing face of the city, much as Hiroshige's series One Hundred Famous Views of Edo had 75 years earlier.

The artists called themselves the Takujōsha ("Table Group") and the prints were published by the group via Nakajima Jutaro of the Nihon Sosaku Hanga Club. Each artist contributed 12 or 13 prints. The series was issued on a subscription basis in an edition of only 50 sets. 

In the February 1932 Bulletin of the Hanga Club, Senpan Maekawa wrote:

Only a few complete sets have been preserved, and they are now in institutional or private collections.

Subject matter and techniques

Typical of the sōsaku hanga movement, there was much experimentation with colours and types of paper. The themes and subjects vary; some prints hark back to a bygone era such as Hiratuska's Shinobazu Pond in Snow and Fukazawa's Shiba Zozoji Temple which is reminiscent of Hiroshige's work at the same location. The artists' followed their ukiyo-e predecessors by depicting landscapes and the common people at leisure. In homage to Hiroshige's Fifty-three Stations of the Tōkaidō, which started at the same location, Hiratsuka made the first print Nihonbashi, the central point of the city from which all distances were measured. As was common in ukiyo-e prints from the past, bridges feature in many of the prints.

Despite the inclusion of some traditional views, the group were less concerned with the concept of meishō (famous places) and beautiful scenes, but rather they sought to document the Shōwa era lifestyle and depict the rapidly modernizing city. Sempan chose to depict miniature golf and a factory district, Onchi a coffee shop and cinema interior. Fukazawa shows a baseball game, while his print of a Shell gasoline station foreshadows the work of Pop art.

Gallery

Notes

References

External links

 All 100 images from the series MIT Visualising Cultures, images courtesy Carnegie Museum of Art

Ukiyo-e print series